Denis Lvovich Sverdlov (born 6 June 1978) is a British-based Russian businessman, and the founder and former CEO of Arrival, a British electric vehicle manufacturer based in London. As of April 2022, his net worth was estimated at US$933 million. The businessman who was worth $11.7 billion a year ago in April 2021, lost his billionaire status in April 2022. Sverdlov’s 94% decline in net worth is the largest wealth loss of anyone outside China who appeared on last year’s Bloomberg Billionaires Index.

Early life
Sverdlov was born in 1978 in the then Soviet republic of Georgia. He has a degree in economics from Saint Petersburg State University of Engineering and Economics.

Career
After graduating in 2000 Sverdlov founded IT Vision, an IT consulting firm.

From 2003 to 2007, Sverdlov was the co-founder and managing partner of Korus Consulting, an IT consulting firm in Russia.

Sverdlov was a co-founder and chief executive of Yota, a Russian mobile broadband company, until its acquisition by MegaFon in 2012.

Post-acquisition Sverdlov set up the Kinetik Trust to invest in a range of promising technologies and bring them to market.

He was Russia's deputy Communications and Mass Media Minister for 15 months before stepping down in 2013. He left this position following new legislation which banned government officials from holding assets abroad.

Sverdlov founded Arrival and began its operations in the UK in 2015. He was its CEO from March 2016 until November 2022. In March 2021 Arrival went public through a merger with CIIC Merger Corp.

He is also the founder of Roborace – the world’s first driverless electric racing platform.

Personal life
Sverdlov is married, with three children, and the family moved from France to London in September 2015.

References

1979 births
Living people
Russian company founders
21st-century Russian businesspeople
Russian chief executives
Russian politicians
Government ministers of Russia
21st-century Russian politicians
Russian businesspeople in the United Kingdom
Former billionaires